Woolstencroft is a surname. Notable people with the surname include:

Lauren Woolstencroft, Canadian alpine skier and Paralympic Games gold medalist
Lynne Woolstencroft, Canadian politician and former mayor of Waterloo, Ontario

See also
 Wolstencroft
 Wollstonecraft (disambiguation)